International rules football (also known as international rules in Australia and compromise rules or Aussie rules in Ireland) is a team sport consisting of a hybrid of football codes, which was developed to facilitate international representative matches between Australian rules football players and Gaelic football players.

The first tour, known as the Australian Football World Tour, took place in 1967, with matches played in Ireland, the United Kingdom, and the United States. The following year, games were played between Australia and a touring County Meath Gaelic football team, Meath being the reigning All-Ireland senior football champions. Following intermittent international tests between Australia and Ireland, the International Rules Series between the senior Australia international rules football team and Ireland international rules football team has been played intermittently since 1984, and has generally been a closely matched contest.  The sport has raised interest and exposure in developing markets for Gaelic and Australian football and has been considered a development tool by governing bodies of both codes, particularly by the AFL Commission.

International rules football does not have any dedicated clubs or leagues. It is currently played by men's, women's, and junior teams only in tournaments or Test matches.

Rules

Overview
 
A player must bounce, solo (kick into one's own hands) or touch the ball on the ground once every  or six steps. A maximum of two bounces per possession are allowed, while players can solo the ball as often as they wish on a possession. Unlike in Gaelic football, the ball may be lifted directly off the ground, without putting a foot underneath it first. Players however cannot scoop the ball off the ground to a team-mate, nor pick up the ball if they are on their knees or on the ground. If a foul is committed, a free kick will be awarded, though referees (called umpires in Australian Rules) can give the fouled player advantage to play on at their discretion.

Points are scored as follows:

 Under the crossbar and into the goal net (a goal): 6 points, umpire waves a green flag and raises both index fingers.
 Over the crossbar and between the two large posts (an over): 3 points, umpire waves red flag and raises one arm above his head.
 Between either of the large posts and small posts (a behind): 1 point, umpire waves white flag and raises one index finger.

Scores are written so as to clarify how many of each type of score were made as well as, like Australian football, giving the total points score for each team; for example, if a team scores one goal, four overs and 10 behinds, the score is written as 1–4–10 (28), meaning one goal (six points) plus 4 overs (4 × 3 = 12 points) plus 10 behinds (10 × 1 = 10 points), for a total score of 28 points.

An international rules match lasts for 72 minutes (divided into four quarters of 18 minutes each). Inter-county Gaelic football matches go on for 70 minutes, divided into two halves, while Australian rules matches consist of four 20-minute quarters of game time (although with the addition of stoppage time, most quarters actually last around 30 minutes).

As in Gaelic football, teams consist of fifteen players, including a goalkeeper, whereas eighteen are used in Australian rules (with no keeper).

Alterations
A number of rule changes were introduced before the 2006 International Rules Series:

 Match time reduced from 80 minutes to 72 minutes. Time per quarter was reduced from 20 minutes to 18 minutes.
 A player who received a red card is to be sent off, and no replacement is allowed; in addition to this, a penalty is awarded regardless of where the incident takes place. (Previously, a replacement was allowed and a penalty was only awarded if the incident happened in the penalty area.)
 A yellow card now means a 15-minute sin bin for the offending player, who will be sent off if he receives a second card.

Further alterations were made before the 2008 International Rules Series:
 Maximum of 10 interchanges per quarter.
 Teams are allowed only four consecutive hand passes (ball must then be kicked).

 The goalkeeper can no longer kick the ball to himself from the kick-out.
 Suspensions may carry over to GAA and AFL matches if the Match Review Panel sees fit.
 A dangerous "slinging" tackle will be an automatic red card.
 A front-on bump (known as a shirtfront in Australian football) endangering the head will result in a red card.
 Physical intimidation can result in a yellow card.
 The keeper cannot be tackled or touched when the keeper is charging.
 An independent referee can cite players for reportable offences from the stands.
 Yellow card sin bin reduced to 10 minutes.

The most recent changes were made ahead of the 2014 International Rules Series:
 Maximum number of interchanges per quarter increased from 10 to 16.
 Unlimited number of interchanges allowed at quarter and half time breaks.
 Number of consecutive hand-passes teams are allowed increased from 4 to 6.
 Marks will not be paid for backwards kicks caught by a teammate.
 Goalkeepers required to kick the ball out beyond the 45 m line after all wides, behinds and overs.
 Failure of a goalkeeper to kick over the 45 m line will result in a free kick to the opposition (from the 45 m line).

Around the world

International rules has been played in various locations throughout North America and the Caribbean, Europe, Asia, and Australia and New Zealand between fledgling Australian rules football and Gaelic football clubs.

In 2006, an exhibition match between South African youth teams and an Indigenous Australian touring side composed of players from the Clontarf Foundation, led by Sydney's Adam Goodes, was held at Potchefstroom.

The University of Birmingham holds an annual International Rules match between its Australian Rules football team and its Gaelic Football team, with the 2013 edition won by the Australian Rules team 56–55, before a crowd of over 400 students.

In the International Rules Series, the most well-known International Rules event, Australia and Ireland are at an impasse, with 10 series wins apiece. Most recently in 2017, Australia defeated Ireland with two Test wins and an aggregate score of 116–103.

Amateur tours
The Australian Amateur Football Council has sent an amateur Under-23 All-Australian team to Ireland in both 2005 and 2008. The Australian amateur team wore a different jersey to the AFL representative side, dark green and gold, with a kangaroo emblem. Recently, the Victorian Amateur Football Association (VAFA) has sent a squad of players sourced from the top six divisions of its competition to tour Ireland and play various clubs and representative teams.

See also
 AFLX
 Comparison of Gaelic football and Australian rules football
 International Rules Series
 List of International Rules Series results

References

External links

 International rules series on the GAA website
 International rules on AFL website
 Laws of the game (2014)
 International rules on World Footy News
 Results and rankings on Tarik's website (archived, 1 Nov 2008)

 
Football codes
Sports originating in Ireland
Sports originating in Australia
Variations of Australian rules football
Hybrid sports
Games and sports introduced in 1967
Comparison of Gaelic football and Australian rules football
1967 establishments in Ireland
1967 establishments in Australia